Lestidium nudum , the deep water pike smelt, is a species of fish. It is found in the Pacific Ocean. 

References 

 Tinker, S.W., 1978. Fishes of Hawaii, a handbook of the marine fishes of Hawaii and the Central Pacific Ocean. Hawaiian Service Inc., Honolulu. 568 p.

Paralepididae
Fish of the Pacific Ocean
Fish of Hawaii
Taxa named by Charles Henry Gilbert
Fish described in 1905